Events in the year 1987 in Belgium.

Incumbents
 Monarch: Baudouin
 Prime Minister: Wilfried Martens

Events
 6 March – Herald of Free Enterprise disaster off Zeebrugge
 30 March – Nicole Van Goethem's A Greek Tragedy wins Academy Award for Best Animated Short Film at the 59th Academy Awards
 1 September – Royal order prohibiting smoking in roofed public spaces comes into force.
 21 October – Government falls over Voeren crisis
 13 December – 1987 Belgian general election

Publications
 Geert Bekaert, Landschap van kerken: 10 eeuwen bouwen in Vlaanderen (Leuven, Davidsfonds), with photographs by Lieve Blancquaert
 Bettie Vanhoudt, Éléments de Description du Leke: Langue Bantoue de Zone C (Tervuren, Royal Museum for Central Africa)

Births
 24 May – Déborah François, actress

Deaths
 16 July – Pierre Lardinois (born 1924), politician

References

 
1980s in Belgium
20th century in Belgium
Events in Belgium
Deaths in Belgium